The Moodys is an Australian television comedy series, which follows on from A Moody Christmas. The Moodys began airing on ABC on 5 February 2014 and aired in the United States on Hulu in Spring 2014.

Originally written and created by Trent O'Donnell and Phil Lloyd at Jungleboys, this series also involved some guest writers for an episode each: Patrick Brammall (Episode 5) and Ian Meadows (Episode 7).

Plot
In this series, Dan Moody (Ian Meadows) has returned from London to live in Australia, with his now-girlfriend Cora Benson (Jane Harber). This series explores the highs and lows of their rocky relationship, develops several storylines from the other family members and introduces some new characters to the show.  It is based over a year of family events rather than a succession of Christmas Days, as it did in the first series.  Shot in Sydney, each episode is approximately 30 minutes.

Crew
Executive Producers: Jason Burrows (Jungleboys) and Andrew Gregory (ABC)
Co Producers: Phil Lloyd and Trent O'Donnell
Directors: Trent O'Donnell and Scott Pickett
Series Producer: Chloe Rickard
Co Producer/Post Production Producer: Nicola Woolfrey
Editor: Paul Swain

Cast
Dan Moody, the main protagonist – Ian Meadows
Sean Moody, Dan's brother, – Patrick Brammall
Kevin Moody – Danny Adcock
Maree Moody, Dan's mother – Tina Bursill
Terry Moody, Dan's uncle– Darren Gilshenan
Bridget Quail, Dan's sister – Rachel Gordon
Cora Benson, Hayden's girlfriend and Dan's love interest – Jane Harber
Roger Quail, Dan's brother-in-law – Phil Lloyd
Yvonne Tisdale – Sacha Horler
Hayden Roberts, Dan's cousin – Guy Edmonds
Lucy - Madeleine Madden

Episodes

References

External links

Australian Broadcasting Corporation original programming
2014 Australian television series debuts
2014 Australian television series endings
Australian television sitcoms
Television series about families
Television shows set in Sydney